Alan Sydney Minter (17 August 19519 September 2020) was a British professional boxer who competed from 1972 to 1981. He held the undisputed middleweight title in 1980, having previously held the British middleweight title from 1975 to 1976, and the European middleweight title twice between 1977 and 1979. As an amateur, Minter won a bronze medal in the light-middleweight division at the 1972 Summer Olympics.

Early life
Minter was born in Penge, Bromley, Kent, to his German-born mother Anne Minter, and his father Syd Minter, a plasterer. His family moved to Crawley, West Sussex, and he joined Crawley Boxing Club at aged 11, training under John Hillier and Dougie Bidwell.

Amateur career 
Minter took part at the 1970 European Junior Championships at the middleweight division, but in the very first fight he was stopped in the 2-nd round by Vyacheslav Lemeshev (USSR). Because Minter was the 1971 Amateur Boxing Association of England Middleweight Champion, he was selected to box for UK in the Olympics 1972. He won a bronze medal at the 1972 Munich Olympic Games in the light-middleweight classification, losing in the semifinal to Dieter Kottysch of West Germany by a 3-2 marginal decision which was hotly disputed. Kottysch went on to win the gold medal.

1972 Olympic results 
Minter's results at the 1972 Munich Olympics are as follows:

 Round of 64: bye
 Round of 32: Defeated Reggie Ford (Guyana) by second-round knockout
 Round of 16: Defeated Valeri Tregubov (Soviet Union) by decision, 5–0
 Quarterfinal: Defeated Loucif Hamani (Algeria) by decision, 4–1
 Semifinal: Lost to Dieter Kottysch (West Germany) by decision, 2–3 (was awarded bronze medal)

Professional career 
Minter began his professional career with 11 straight wins, the first against Maurice Thomas in London on 31 October 1972, winning by knockout in the 6th round.
Minter won his first five fights by knockout until 16 January 1973, when Pat Dwyer went the distance, Minter taking the fight on points. Minter won his next five fights, three by knockout, before being defeated for the first time after the referee stopped the fight in the eighth round against "Scottish" Don McMillan due to bad cuts suffered by Minter. Two more wins followed before facing Jan Magdziarz, who beat him twice in a row (once in the eighth and once in the sixth) again due to cuts.

1974 was a mixed year for Minter, beating Tony Byrne by a decision in eight, losing in two to Ricky Torres (again on cuts), having a third fight with Magdziarz, resulting in a no contest, closing the year with a win against Shako Mamba in Hamburg, Germany.

In 1975, he won four fights in a row, including another bout in Hamburg and, by the end of the year, he challenged Kevin Finnegan for the British Middleweight title, winning it by a 15-round decision.

In 1976, he won six fights, to extend his streak to ten consecutive wins. Among the boxers he beat were Billy Knight by a knockout and Finnegan once again, by decision in 15, both in defence of his British title, along with former world title challenger Tony Licata, knocked out in six and United States Olympic Games Gold medal winner Sugar Ray Seales, in five rounds. These wins gave Minter a ranking among the top ten Middleweight challengers.

In 1977, he won the European Middleweight title by beating Germano Valsecchi by a knockout in five in Italy. But in his next fight his winning streak ended when he lost to former world title challenger Ronnie Harris by a knockout in eight. Minter returned to top ten challenger status by upsetting the former World Welterweight and Light Middleweight Champion Emile Griffith with a ten-round decision win in Monte Carlo, but then he lost his European title to Gratien Tonna by a knockout in eight at Milan. He closed '77 with a third 15-round decision win over Finnegan to retain his British title.

1978 was a sad year for Minter, although he won all three of his bouts. On 15 February, at the Muhammad Ali–Leon Spinks I undercard in Las Vegas, Nevada, he won his first bout in the United States by knocking out Sandy Torres in five. Then, he went to Italy once again to regain his European Middleweight title by knocking out Angelo Jacopucci in twelve rounds. Jacopucci died a few days afterwards, due to injuries sustained in the bout. Minter finished his year by avenging his loss to Tonna with a six-round knockout.

In 1979, Minter won all four of his fights, two of them by knockout. On 16 March 1980, in Las Vegas, he was given a shot at World Middleweight Champion Vito Antuofermo's title at Caesars Palace. He won the title by a 15-round split decision in which the judges' scorecards varied wildly. A Venezuelan judge had Minter losing the fight, while the British judge (Roland Dakin) had Minter winning 13 of the 15 rounds. In a rematch held three months later in London on 28 June, Minter retained the world title by a TKO in eight rounds.
 
On 27 September 1980, Minter's short run as world champion came to an abrupt end when he was stopped on cuts in the third round against 'Marvelous' Marvin Hagler at Wembley Arena in London. The fight was controversial owing to a racist remark Minter made during the build-up, which Minter had later tried to qualify, and then by a crowd riot once the referee had agreed with Minter's corner that he was unable to continue, with chairs, bottles and glasses being hurled into the ring after the decision.

Minter beat fringe contender Ernie Singletary in London, in 1981, but after losses to future Hagler challengers Mustafa Hamsho in Las Vegas and Tony Sibson in London, he retired for good.

He left boxing with a record of 39 wins, 9 losses and 1 no contest, with 23 wins by knockout.

Death
Minter died of cancer in September 2020, in Guildford at the age of 69.

Professional boxing record

See also 
List of middleweight boxing champions
List of WBC world champions

References

External links

Alan Minter profile at Cyber Boxing Zone

|-

1951 births
2020 deaths
Sportspeople from Crawley
English male boxers
Olympic boxers of Great Britain
Boxers at the 1972 Summer Olympics
Olympic bronze medallists for Great Britain
World middleweight boxing champions
Southpaw boxers
England Boxing champions
Olympic medalists in boxing
Medalists at the 1972 Summer Olympics
Light-middleweight boxers
The Ring (magazine) champions
European Boxing Union champions
World Boxing Association champions
World Boxing Council champions
British Boxing Board of Control champions
Deaths from cancer in England